The 2022–23 season is the 103rd season in the history of Empoli F.C. and their second consecutive season in the top flight. The club are participating in Serie A and  the Coppa Italia.

Players

Out on loan

Pre-season and friendlies 

The team's pre-season camp began on 5–6 July in Monteboro.

Competitions

Overall record

Serie A

League table

Results summary

Results by round

Matches 
The league fixtures were announced on 24 June 2022.

Coppa Italia

References 

Empoli F.C. seasons
Empoli